Todra volcanic field is a volcanic field in the Aïr region, Niger.

The field consists of about 150 volcanoes, whose position is fault controlled.

The field may have had historical eruptions.

See also 

 Tin Taralle volcanic field

References 

Volcanic fields